Eva Grlić (1920 – 31 July 2008) was Croatian journalist and writer, mother of famous Croatian film director and producer Rajko Grlić.

Early life and education
Grlić was born in Budapest to a Jewish family. Her father Oskar (Osias) Ješua Izrael, was Sephardi Jew and her mother Katica Klingenberg, was Ashkenazi Jew. She was taught Ladino language and to Jewish customs. Grlić learned Hungarian from her mother, and Bosnian from her father. She spent her childhood and adolescence in Sarajevo. Already in her adolescence years, Grlić belonged to a left-oriented youth in Sarajevo, and with them she went on an organized tours, or winter skiing. Soon she felt effectiveness of pre-war Yugoslav dictatorship, when police got hold of letters that were sent to her from Spain by her boyfriend Miljenko Cvitković, a volunteer with International Brigades. Because of those letters, Grlić was fined with court ban from further education on the territory of the Kingdom of Yugoslavia. In 1938, she moved with her family to Zagreb. In Zagreb, she attended and completed a steno-typing course and was easily employed as a secretary in several private companies.

World War II, later life and career
In April 1940, Grlić married Rudolf Domany, brother of Robert Domany, with whom she had only daughter, Vesna Domany Hardy born in May 1941. Her husband Rudolf was killed by Ustaše as a hostage in September 1941. In the meantime, other family members lost their right to apartments in the center of Zagreb, so with her daughter, mother, grandmother Tereza Kohn and her late husband's parents, Grlić moved in the apartment of her late husband cousin, Antonia Špicner. In February 1942, Ustaše started with the deportations of remaining Jews in Zagreb, and only Grlić, her daughter and mother managed to save themselves from the deportation. Grlić soon joined the Partisans where she wrote for ZAVNOH newspaper Vjesnik. During that war time, Oto and Ruža Fuchs took care of her daughter. Ruža Fuchs was named Righteous Among the Nations in 1987. Grlić's mother also joined the Partisans and was killed during Operation Trio in 1942. The rest of their family perished during the Holocaust, among them Grlić father. Only Grlić, her uncle Moše Izrael and her daughter have survived the Holocaust. In 1945, Grlić returned to Zagreb to be reunited with her daughter, 4 at the time. From 1945 to 1949, Grlić worked with many newspapers, among them Vjesnik and Naprijed. For three years, Grlić was imprisoned at the Goli Otok prison as the political enemy of the SFR Yugoslavia. Grlić also worked as a translator from German and Hungarian. In 1998, Grlić published the autobiographical fiction Sjećanje about her life before and after the war, as leftist. Sjećanje was also published in Hungarian and Italian language. Her second husband was Zagreb Marxist humanist and philosopher Danko Grlić, with whom she had an only child, son Rajko. In 2002, Grlić published the book Putnik za Krakow i druge priče. Grlić died on 31 July 2008 in Zagreb and was buried at the Mirogoj Cemetery.

Published works
 Sjećanje, Durieux, 1998
 Putnik za Krakow i druge priče, Durieux, 2002

References

Bibliography

 
 

1920 births
2008 deaths
Writers from Budapest
Burials at Mirogoj Cemetery
Croatian Ashkenazi Jews
Croatian Sephardi Jews
Croatian people of Hungarian-Jewish descent
Croatian people of Bosnia and Herzegovina-Jewish descent
20th-century Croatian writers
Jewish Hungarian writers
Croatian journalists
Croatian women journalists
Yugoslav Partisans members
Croatian people of World War II
Women in the Yugoslav Partisans
20th-century journalists
Hungarian emigrants to Yugoslavia